Xie Yuchen (born 12 May 1996) is a Chinese female discus thrower, who won an individual gold medal at the Youth World Championships.

References

External links

1996 births
Living people
Chinese female discus throwers
21st-century Chinese women